Wolfgang Ernst I, Count of Isenburg-Büdingen (Birstein, 29 December 1560 – Birstein, 21 May 1633) was a German count of the House of Isenburg. He was count of Isenburg-Birstein from 1596 to 1633, after violently seizing power from Henry of Isenburg-Rönneburg.

-- Early life ==
Wolfgang was the son of Philipp II, Count of Isenburg-Büdingen und Birstein (1526-1596) and his wife, Countess Irmengard of Solms-Braunfels (1536-1577). Through his mother he was first cousin once removed of Amalia of Solms-Braunfels, Princess consort of Orange and first cousin of Johannetta of Sayn-Wittgenstein sister-in-law of William the Silent.

Family and children 
He married four times and had several children, who inherited his land after his death.

First, he was married on 26 September 1585 with Countess Anna of Gleichen-Rhemda (1565–1598) who bore him the following children:
Wolfgang Henry, Count of Isenburg-Büdingen-Birstein (1588–1635) line of Isenburg-Büdingen-Birstein
Countess Anna Amalie of Isenburg-Büdingen-Birstein (1591–1667), married Arnold Jost of Bentheim-Bentheim (1580-1643), son of Arnold III, Count of Bentheim-Steinfurt-Tecklenburg-Limburg
Count Philipp Ludwig of Isenburg-Büdingen-Birstein (1593–1616) (in a duel) 
Count Philipp Ernst of Isenburg-Büdingen-Birstein (1595–1635)
Count Wilhelm Otto of Isenburg-Büdingen-Birstein (1597–1667)

Secondly, he married on 16 Aprile 1603 with Countess Elisabeth of Nassau-Dillenburg (1564–1611) a daughter of Johann VI, Count of Nassau-Dillenburg and widow of Philip IV, Count of Nassau-Weilburg but the marriage was childless.

Thirdly, he married on 19 Aprile 1616 with Countess Juliane of Sayn-Wittgenstein (1583–1627) a daughter of Louis I, Count of Sayn-Wittgenstein (1532–1605) from his second marriage with Countess Elisabeth of Solms-Laubach (1549-1599) who bore him one son:
Johann Ernst, Count of Isenburg-Büdingen-Büdingen (1625–1673) line of Isenburg-Büdingen

On 24 Jun 1628 he married for a fourth time, this time morganatically to Sabine von Saalfeld (d. 1635).

Ancestry

References

House of Isenburg
1560 births
1633 deaths